Salem No. 7 is a public art work by artist Antoni Milkowski located at the Lynden Sculpture Garden near Milwaukee, Wisconsin. The Cor-Ten steel sculpture is a geometric form composed of six cubes surrounding a seventh cube of empty space; it is installed on the lawn.

References

1967 sculptures
Outdoor sculptures in Milwaukee
Steel sculptures in Wisconsin